The manga series Vinland Saga by Makoto Yukimura contains a mixture of historical, apocryphal, and invented characters in its cast. The major characters are of Danish descent—Vikings brought to England to assist King Sweyn's invasion of the country. The series is divided into four story arc focused on Thorfinn, a young viking who wishes to kill his superior Askeladd as revenge for the death of his father, Thors. In following arcs, an older Thorfinn questions his sins and decides to atone for them by finding the land Vinland which he was told as a child where people can live in peace. However, Thorfinn has issues with starting a new life as he is encounters people related to his life as a viking who share interests on the young man.

The series was influenced by Makoto Yukimura's thoughts with vikings as thety were hailed as heroes despite their violent methods with Thorfinn's development being how to atone for his killings. As the story progresses, Yukimura creates new characters needed to help the protagonist often using historical figures. Critical response to the cast has been positive for their traits and action scenes.

Creation
While the vikings are recognized as heroes, Yukimura wanted to explain the harsh reality that was their era. Because of the harsh violence, the character of Thorfinn was always drawn with a serious expression in the first arc as well as with self-deprecation one in the following where he pitied himself for his sins. As a result, the character of Thorkell is characterized as more comical and thus makes the battles more enjoyable to draw. While Thorfinn's design changes across the manga, Yukimura gave attention to the several cuts in Thorfinn's hands as a result as a sign of always fighting alone. When drawing, Yukimura paid attention to drawing hands as he claims they are more expressive than faces and give a brief explanation of the person's personality. This was influenced by manga author Katsuhiro Otomo.

Yukimura insists that when writing the characters, most of them are who Thorfinn need with Askeladd being a rare exception as he is both Thorfinn's mentor and an enemy at the same time. Their relationship is also meant to look like father and son as during the beginning of the series, Yukimura was planning Askeladd's death and how Thorfinn would react to that. Another complicated relationship involves Einar and Thorfinn as the two cannot help each other due to dark narrative they are involved. Across several things Thorfinn does in the manga, one of them was learning the effects of revenge and how it affects others. Yukimura has regrets in how he wrote Einar.

Several characters are based on real life. The historical Leif Eiriksson is one of the most famous Norsemen according to the author. However, Yukimura imagined that he would have had a very weak nature as a warrior so he instead fleshed him out as a strong adventurer. In retrospect, Yukimura found that the series features prominently male characters as the female ones either have few screentime or die. One of the few exceptions is Gudrid due to how she is based on a historical figure with the same name who makes a major impact on Thorfinn's life and the author tries being faithful to such event. Meanwhile, the revengeful hunter Hild was made to remind Thorfinn of his sins as a viking in the same way with how the series starts with Thorfinn wanting revenge on Askeladd.

For the anime adaptation of the series, Wit Studio said there was a strong sense of camaraderie toward an individual, Askeladd, that brought them vikings together. They portrayed Askeladd as being able to take charge because others viewed him as powerful. They were also careful not to depict the supporting characters as overly dependent on their leader, as that would diminish their individual charm. The anime also added new scenes about how Thorfinn turned into one of Askeladd's soldiers rather than just make a time-skip which the manga artist appreciated. The director claimed that for these anime original scenes they also tried to keep Askeladd in-character. He further said that the story about Askeladd's forces was entertaining to see.

Characters

Introduced in the first story arc

Thorfinn is a teenage warrior in Askeladd's company, though he hates his commander for slaying his father Thors and has sworn to kill him in a duel. To earn the right to engage in these duels, he must complete difficult feats for Askeladd, such as sabotage or the killing of enemy generals. Thorfinn is a Jomsviking noble through his mother, Helga, and inherited superb physical talents from his father. He does not fight for the love of battle, but is still prone to losing his composure when in combat. This hotheadedness often costs him battles against more experienced opponents. He is loosely based on the historical personage of early Vinland explorer Thorfinn Karlsefni.

Askeladd is the commander of a small but powerful Viking band, which owed its success to Askeladd's exceptional intelligence. Ten years before the main Vinland Saga storyline, Askeladd accepted a contract to assassinate Thors, father of Thorfinn. During the Viking invasion and war in England, he manipulated Thorfinn's desire for revenge against him as a way of keeping the gifted young fighter in his service. Askeladd is one of the most skilled fighters in the series, and is particularly adept at predicting his opponents' moves in combat. He is half-Danish and half-Welsh, the son of a Welsh princess captured by a Viking raider; his mother gave him the name Lucius Artorius Castus, the legitimate king of Britain, but he received the nickname Askeladd (covered in ash) as a boy while working for a blacksmith. He believes in the legend of Avalon, which inspired him to support Prince Canute's bid for kingship of the Danes. He ultimately sacrifices himself assassinating King Sweyn in order to install Canute as the Danish King and to ensure the safety of Wales from Denmark. Askeladd shares the name of Askeladden, a Norwegian folk character known for his cleverness. His backstory is based on the early life of Olaf the Peacock, an Icelandic chieftain and major character of Laxdæla saga.

Bjorn is Askeladd's second in command, a burly man who fights for the love of combat. He is a berserker, able to enter powerful rages through the consumption of certain mushrooms. Bjorn was gravely wounded in Gainsborough from injuries sustained protecting Prince Canute; with his remaining time, he challenged Askeladd in a duel. During the duel, Bjorn revealed that he always wanted to be Askeladd's friend, and Askeladd replied that he was his only friend, before dealing the final blow. Bjørn is Danish, Norwegian and Swedish for "bear", a given name commonly associated with Vikings.

The father of Thorfinn, Thors is a Jomsviking general whose phenomenal combat prowess earns him the epithet "The Troll of Jom". Thors grows weary of battle after the birth of his children, fakes his own death at the Battle of Hjörungavágr, and retires to become a pacifist farmer after moving his family away in secret. The Jomsvikings later discover that Thors is alive and force him to return to the battlefield. Before he can arrive at the theater of war he is betrayed by a former comrade, Floki, who hires Askeladd to assassinate him. Thors is largely considered the greatest fighter to appear in the series until his death, having defeated Askeladd in single combat, and being the only man in the world who was stronger than Thorkell back when they were young. Such was his strength that Floki was unwilling to engage him directly, even with an entire squadron of Jomsviking warriors.

Thorkell is a Jomsviking general, brother of the Jomsviking Chief, uncle-in-law of Thors and grand uncle of Thorfinn. A giant man who loves combat, he defects from the Danish army to become a mercenary for the English, believing that fighting his fellow Vikings will give him a better challenge. This same love of war leads him to support Prince Canute's bid for kingship of the Danes. He remains under Canute once he becomes king. Before the defection of Thors, Thorkell worked with and highly respected the man, resulting in a fondness for his son Thorfinn. He duels twice with Thorfinn and dominates each time, though he loses two fingers in the first duel and an eye in the second. In battle, Thorkell typically wields a pair of axes as his primary weapons, but his greatest asset is probably his vast physical strength. Due to his colossal power, Thorkell is considered the strongest viking and warrior in the series, with one character believing that 4000 men aren't enough to stop Thorkell. He fights with a band of vikings called the Death Seekers who share his love for war. Thorkell's character is based on Thorkell the Tall, a historical Jomsviking lord who is a mentor to Canute in the Flateyjarbók.

Canute is the 17-year-old prince of the Danes. He is initially portrayed as timid and womanly, and unable to function without his retainer Ragnar. These traits, along with his strong Christianity, earn him the mockery of the Vikings with whom he works. After Ragnar's death, however, he has a sharp reversal of personality, becomes strong and kingly, and develops an ambition to create utopia on Earth before God's return. Towards this end, he plots to overthrow his father Sweyn Forkbeard and take the crown of the Danes. Canute is based on the historical King Canute the Great, the most prominent Danish ruler of England.

Leif is a cheerful old man from Greenland. A sailor, he claims to have traveled to a distant western land called Vinland. When Thorfinn joins Askeladd's band and is assumed dead by the other Icelanders, Leif does not give up hope and devotes his life to finding him. He is based on the historical Leif Erikson.

Introduced in the second story arc

 Ian Sinclair (Crunchyroll dub), Alejandro Saab (Netflix dub) (English)
Einar is an Anglo-Norse farmer from Northern England who, following attacks on his village, was sold into slavery and eventually ends up on Ketil's farm. As a result, he is outspoken in his hatred of war and injustice. Einar meets Thorfinn at Ketil's farm and the two become close friends and brothers. Einar has little skill in combat, but proves a loyal companion.

 Natalie Van Sistine (Crunchyroll dub), Gilli Messer (Netflix dub) (English) 
Arnheid is Ketil's slave, along with Thorfinn and Einar. She is Ketil's personal maid and concubine. Arnheid is a beautiful, slender woman with long wavy blonde hair. Kind, hard-working and honest, she tries her best to get through her slave life without trouble.

 (Japanese); Doug Jackson (Crunchyroll dub), Sean Burgos (Netflix dub) (English)
Ketil is a Danish landowner who buys Thorfinn and then Einar as slaves.

 (Japanese); TBA (Crunchyroll dub), Jason Griffith (Netflix dub) (English)
Snake is the leader of the security guards on Ketil's farm. He is far more intelligent and experienced than the men he commands.

 (Japanese); Anthony DiMascio (Crunchyroll dub), Ryan Colt Levy (Netflix dub) (English)
Olmar is the younger of Ketil's sons. He hates farming and dreams of going to war, although he is cowardly and inexperienced.

Thorgil

Thorgil is eldest of Ketil's sons and an experienced fighter.

Introduced in the third story arc

Gudrid is a young woman originally from Greenland. As a child, she heard stories of the outside world from Leif and dreamed of becoming a sailor, but, as a woman, was not allowed to become one. She is Leif's sister-in-law, the widow of his brother Thorvald. She is set to remarry to Sigurd, son of Halfdan, but escapes on their wedding night and joins Thorfinn and Leif's party. Two years later she marries Thorfinn and they have adopted a son named Karli. Gudrid is based on the historical Gudrid Thorbjarnardóttir.

Hild is a female hunter from Norway. Originally an inventor and carpenter, her life changed when Askeladd's band attacked her village and killed her family. Many years later, she encounters Thorfinn and tries to kill him as vengeance. However, she is intrigued by his desire to create a peaceful society and temporarily spares him; she joins the party to ensure he is serious about it, and pledges to kill him if he returns to violence. However, after spending time with Thorfinn and his crew, she forgives him. She is armed with a custom crossbow that is designed for quick-fire reloading.

Karli is the baby son of one of Leif's friends. A feud between families resulted in a viking massacre on his village, of which Karli was the sole survivor along his guardian dog. Orphaned and without relatives willing to take him in, he was adopted by Thorfinn and Gudrid.

Garm is a psychopathic mercenary who wields a custom spear which can separate into two short spears whenever he desires to use them. He was considered an idiot and later a beast as a child due to his lack of morals, believing that war is a game and everyone fighting in it is his friend. Similar to Thorkell, he is obsessed with fighting those who are strong and tries to fight with Thorfinn multiple times throughout the Baltic Sea War saga and was responsible for the death of Jomsviking Captain Vagn as he wanted to fight him. He is defeated by Thorfinn and declares that he would face him again for a rematch, believing that the two are friends as he leaves.

Reception
Early response to the cast centered around the misrelationship between Thorfinn and Askeladd due to the former's quest for revenge against the latter even though they work together. Anime UK News said that while Thorkell is initially presented a main antagonist due to how he took Canute, the narrative does not make a black and white morality as Askeladd's forces are still presented as overly violent to civilians. The ending of the first season was well received for how a single death brought a major impact to both Thorfinn and Canute for how they change when such event occurs. Yukimura's artwork was praised for making every page of the manga overdetailed especially facial expressions. The action scenes the characters were involved into were the subject of praise for how well they were illustrated as well as because of the handling of the fighter Thorkell notable for his supernatural strength, Thorkell's fight against Thorfinn being a nominee in 4th Crunchyroll Anime Awards in 2020 for "Best Fight" but lost to Demon Slayer: Kimetsu no Yaiba.

Following Askeladd's death, critics were surprised by Thorfinn's quieter personality and his parallelism with a corrupted Canute while also giving focus on slaves even if it employed less action sequences. Sportskeeda noted that Thorfinn's character arc into a pacifist is highly notable in how it changes his characterization to the point of calling it one of most interesting from seinen manga. The inclusion of prominent female characters in the third story arc attracted more critics as the narrative usually was employed more male character in previous arcs instead. The romance between Thorfinn and Gurdrid was praised for giving the a more lighter tone to the manga famous for its violence. For the fourth story arc, Manga Sanctuary said Thorfinn now lives to his father's legacy during his quest while finding his new found family appealing.

There was also commentary behind the voice acting with the performances of Shizuka Ishigami and Yūto Uemura being praised by Anime News Network for the amount of yells the character performs. Decider also praised the English acting, singling out Allegra Clark's Ylva.

References

External links
  
  

Vinland Saga